Legacy is a 1998 action film directed by T. J. Scott. The film stars David Hasselhoff and Donita Rose.

Synopsis
Jack Scott (David), an American war photographer, goes to the Philippines and helps Lana Cameron (Donita), an Asian American medical student, on a dangerous quest for her legacy and missing father.

Cast and characters
David Hasselhoff as Jack Scott
Donita Rose as Lana Cameron
Rod Steiger as Sadler
Corin Nemec as Black
Douglas O'Keeffe as Edge
Victoria Pratt as Ding
Chin Chin Gutierrez as Grace
Junix Inocian as Santiago
Benson Ventura as Hector
Naess Verano as Zero
Gary Lim as Bansot
Richard Joson as Tommy
Mon Confiado as doorman
Michele Rogers as The New York Times editor
Cary Kwasizur as photojournalist

References

External links

1998 films
1998 action films
1998 independent films
1990s English-language films
American independent films
Films directed by T. J. Scott
Films set in Metro Manila
Films shot in Metro Manila
Films shot in the Philippines
Quantum Films films
Star Cinema films
1990s American films